The Alaskan Hotel and Bar, also known as the Northlander Hotel and The Alaskan, is a historic establishment and the oldest operating hotel in Juneau, Alaska. It was opened in 1913. The owners, three miners who struck it rich in the nearby Coast Range, tied the hotel's keys to a helium balloon and released it, signifying that the hotel would never close. The building was briefly condemned in the 1970s, but was rehabilitated by the new owners.

The building was listed on the National Register of Historic Places in 1978 and was included as a contributing property to Juneau Downtown Historic District in 1994.

In 2003, the Food Network show Food Finds filmed a segment at the establishment. In September 2013, the Travel Channel program Hotel Impossible filmed an episode at the hotel.

See also
National Register of Historic Places listings in Juneau, Alaska

References

External links

 The Alaskan Hotel and Bar

1913 establishments in Alaska
Buildings and structures on the National Register of Historic Places in Juneau, Alaska
Companies based in Juneau, Alaska
Culture of Juneau, Alaska
Drinking establishments in Alaska
Drinking establishments on the National Register of Historic Places in Alaska
Historic district contributing properties in Alaska
Hotels established in 1913
Hotel buildings on the National Register of Historic Places in Alaska